During the 1996 United States presidential election, newspapers, magazines, and other publications made general election endorsements.

According to Editor & Publisher, based on responses to their quadrennial poll, Bob Dole received a total of 122 endorsements (total circulation of 7,475,578), and 80 papers supported Bill Clinton, though with a higher total circulation of 8,287,436.  Libertarian candidate Harry Browne received one endorsement.

Newspapers 

Corpus Christi Caller Times, Tex.: Dole
Dallas Morning News: Dole
The Day of New London, Conn.: Dole
El Paso Herald-Post, Tex.: Dole
Evansville Courier, Ind.: Dole
Charlotte Observer: Clinton
News & Record (Greensboro, NC): Clinton
The Times (Shreveport, LA): Clinton
Maine Sunday Telegram: Clinton
The Record (Bergen, New Jersey): Clinton
Detroit News: Dole
Washington Times: Dole
Asbury Park Press, Neptune, N.J.: Clinton
Arizona Daily Star, Tucson: Clinton
Atlanta Constitution: Clinton
Charleston Gazette, W.Va.: Clinton
Concord Monitor, N.H.: Clinton
Courier-News, Bridgewater, New Jersey: Clinton
Des Moines Register: Clinton
Detroit Free Press: Clinton
Florida Today: Clinton
The Great Falls Tribune, Mont.: Clinton
The Honolulu Advertiser: Clinton
The Las Vegas Sun: Clinton
Louisville Courier-Journal: Clinton
Mesa Tribune, Ariz.: Clinton
Nashville Banner: Clinton
New York Daily News: Clinton
Newsday, Long Island, N.Y.: Clinton 
Philadelphia Daily News: Clinton
Oregonian, Portland: Clinton
Statesman Journal, Salem, Ore.: Clinton
San Francisco Examiner: Clinton
Santa Fe New Mexican: Clinton
Seattle Post-Intelligencer: Clinton
Star Ledger, Newark: Clinton
St. Paul Pioneer Press: Clinton
Tennessean, Nashville: Clinton
Times of Trenton, N.J.: Clinton
Union News, Springfield, Mass.: Clinton
Fort Worth Star-Telegram: Dole
Kansas City Star: Dole  Endorsed Bill Clinton in 1992.
The Economist: Dole

References 

1996 United States presidential election endorsements
1990s in mass media
Newspaper endorsements
1990s politics-related lists